Winners of The Deadlys Awards 2009.  The award was an annual celebration of Australian Aboriginal and Torres Strait Islander achievement in music, sport, entertainment and community.

Music
Most Promising New Talent in Music: Yabu Band
Single Release of the Year: Burn - Jessica Mauboy
Album Release off the Year: Been Waiting - Jessica Mauboy
Band of the Year: Saltwater Band
Male Artist of the Year: Gurrumul Yunupingu
Female Artist of the Year: Jessica Mauboy
Outstanding Achievement in RNB and Hip Hop: The Last Kinection
Jimmy Little Lifetime Achievement Award for Contribution to Aboriginal and Torres Strait Islander Music: Seaman Dan
APRA Song of the Year: Running Back - Jessica Mauboy, Sean Mullins and Audius Mtawarira

Sport
Most Promising New Talent in Sport: Jamal Idris
Outstanding Achievement in AFL: Michael O'Loughlin
Outstanding Achievement in Rugby League: Johnathan Thurston
Male Sportsperson of the Year: Michael O'Loughlin
Female Sportsperson of the Year: Rohanee Cox
The Ella Lifetime Achievement Award for Contribution to Aboriginal and Torres Strait Islander Sport: Danny Morseau

The arts
Dancer of the Year: B-Boy 2 Ezy
Outstanding Achievement in Film: Samson and Delilah - Warwick Thornton
Outstanding Achievement in TV: Message Stick - ABC
Achievement in Theatre or Live Performance: Stephen Page - Bangarra
Outstanding Achievement in Literature: Lorraine McGee-Sippell
Male Actor of the Year: Luke Carroll
Female Actor of the Year: Leah Purcell
Visual Artist of the Year: Destiny Deacon

Community
Outstanding Achievement in Education: May O'Brien
Outstanding Achievement in Health: Chicka Dixon
Broadcaster of the Year: Marlene Cummins
Contribution to Employment: Traditional Credit Union

External links
Deadlys 2009 winners at Vibe

2009 in Australian music
The Deadly Awards
Indigenous Australia-related lists